Mosaic Youth Theatre of Detroit is a youth development 501(c)(3) non-profit organization in Detroit, Michigan with a mission is to empower young people to maximize their potential through professional performing arts training and the creation of first-rate theatrical and musical art.

History 
Since its founding in 1992, Mosaic Youth Theatre of Detroit has worked to alleviate gaps in arts education. Founded by Rick Sperling, Mosaic specializes in artistic studies for young actors, singers, and stage technicians. Mosaic's national and international touring performances also work to bring recognition to Detroit as a center for arts and culture and promote a positive image of metro Detroit area youth. The Mosaic Model is built on the goal of providing positive opportunities for positive youth development through performance arts training.

Woodward Wonderland: A Detroit Holiday Celebration 
Detroit Film Theatre:
 ... a nostalgic theatrical journey to magical Motor City destinations."
 -Michigan Chronicle  
Metro Detroit's newest holiday tradition returns to the Detroit Institute of Arts! Filled with whimsical holiday stories innovatively staged, joyous songs from the Mosaic Singers and special guests and surprises, Woodward Wonderland: A Detroit Holiday Celebration kicks off the holiday season ... Detroit-style.

Singsation! Mosaic Singers in Concert 
Detroit Film Theatre
"They can sing, they can dance, and they know just how to bring down the house." - NBC Today Show  
The joint will be jumpin' as the Mosaic Singers take us to the heart of 1930's Harlem – The Cotton Club. The performance will feature jazz standards made famous by the greatest entertainers of the era, Ella Fitzgerald, Louis Armstrong, Billie Holiday and Nat King Cole. With a live jazz combo and swinging dance moves, The Mosaic Singers will work their magic in a performance guaranteed to get audiences on their feet.

Notable alumni

Celia Keenan-Bolger: Broadway actress, 3-time Tony Award nominee
Malaya Watson: 8th place on American Idol (season 13)
Diarra Kilpatrick:actress and writer, known for American Koko (2017), The Salton Sea (2016) and American Koko (2014)

See also 
 Satori Theatre Company of Detroit:  A Detroit youth theater active in the 1970s

References

External links
 Detroit Institute of the Arts
 Mosaic Youth Theater of Detroit

Non-profit organizations based in Michigan
Organizations based in Detroit
Arts organizations established in 1992
Youth theatre companies